Jyoti Arora is an Indian author of several books, including Dream's Sake (2011), Lemon Girl (2014) and You Came Like Hope (2017). She is also a tech blogger.

Biography 
Arora was diagnosed with thalassemia at three months old and left school due to her health in the seventh grade. She continued her education through correspondence schooling. She has completed a B.A. in English (Hons.) from Delhi University, and Master's degrees in English Literature and Applied Psychology from Annamalai University. She has worked as an English tutor and freelance writer, and for an IT recruitment firm based in the United States.

She lives in Ghaziabad.

Works 
 Dream's Sake (2011), V&S Publishers
 Lemon Girl (2014), self-published 
 You Came Like Hope (2017), self-published
 #JustRomance: A collection of 7 short romances.

References

Living people
21st-century Indian novelists
English-language writers from India
Indian women bloggers
Indian bloggers
Indian women novelists
21st-century Indian women writers
21st-century Indian writers
1977 births